Marshall John Blount (born February 16, 1993) is an American asexual activist. Blount is also known as the "Gentle Giant Ace" in the asexual community.

Activism
Blount became involved in asexual activism after negative reactions to his asexuality. He became a board member for Asexual Outreach, a non-profit organization, on May 3, 2020. He was involved with Erie's LGBTQ council until June 2020 when he resigned in protest due to the mayor's negative response to a local protest for George Floyd. Blount later joined the Pennsylvania commission on LGBTQ affairs to continue his work on a government level.

Personal life
Blount, who is of African American descent, is from Erie, Pennsylvania, and graduated from high school while being homeschooled in 2011. He was part of a youth bowling league at Eastway Lanes from 2006 to 2014. At age 23 in 2016, Blount came out as asexual to his family and friends. Blount runs a YouTube channel where he regularly post about asexuality and his experiences through society as someone who is openly asexual.

Awards
In 2020, Blount helped obtain a proclamation for "Ace Week" throughout the Commonwealth of Pennsylvania. In 2013, He was nominated for Erie's 40 under 40 by The Erie Reader for his work in photography.

References

1993 births
Living people
American activists
Asexual men
American LGBT rights activists
LGBT people from Pennsylvania
People from Erie, Pennsylvania
Photographers from Pennsylvania